Masoudabad (also Romanized as Mas‘ūdābād; also known as Maqsudabad (Persian: مَقصود آباد), also Romanized as Maqşūdābād) is a village in Silakhor-e Sharqi Rural District, in the Central District of Azna County, Lorestan Province, Iran. At the 2006 census, its population was 762, in 173 families.

References 

Towns and villages in Azna County